Karl Feistmantl was an Austrian luger who competed in the mid-1950s. He won a silver medal in the men's doubles event at the 1954 European luge championships in Davos, Switzerland.

References
List of European luge champions 

Austrian male lugers
Possibly living people
Year of birth missing
20th-century Austrian people